Nattampatti is a village in Pudukkottai district, Tamil Nadu, India. People of more than 40 castes live in this village.  More than 95% of the people are educated. It is called "Peacock Village" by locals.

Villages in Pudukkottai district